Davide Riccardi (born 9 April 1996) is an Italian football player. He plays for  club Siena.

Club career

Hellas Verona

Loan to Südtirol 
After 6 matches as an un-used substitute in Serie B for Hellas Verona, on 17 January 2017, Riccardi was loaned to Serie C club Südtirol on a 6-month loan deal. On 12 March he made his Serie C debut for Südtirol in a 1–0 home win over Pordenone, he played the entire match. Riccardi ended his loan with 9 appearances, all as a starter.

Loan to Lecce 
On 18 August 2017, Riccardi was signed by Serie C side Lecce on a season-long loan deal. On 21 October he made his Serie C debut for Lecce in a 1–0 away win over Matera, he played the entire match. On 4 November he scored his first professional goal in the 92nd minute of a 1–1 away draw against Fidelis Andria. On 7 November he scored his second goal in the 87th minute of a 2–1 home win over Casertana. In February 2018, Riccardi suffered an anterior cruciate ligament injury and was expected to be out for the rest of the season. Riccardi ended his loan to Lecce with 14 appearances, 2 goal and winning the Serie C title.

Lecce 
After the loan, on 21 June 2018, Riccardi joined Serie B club Lecce on a permanent basis with an undisclosed fee. He played 2 matches in the 2018–19 Serie B season.

On 3 November 2019 he made his Serie A debut against Sassuolo.

Venezia 
On 29 January 2020 he joined Serie B club Venezia on loan. At the same time he extended his contract for Lecce until 2022.

Catanzaro
On 30 September 2020, he moved to Serie C club Catanzaro on loan.

Triestina
On 17 August 2021, he moved to Triestina on permanent basis.

On 31 August 2021, he was loaned to Taranto.

Siena
On 20 August 2022, Riccardi signed a multi-year contract with Siena.

Career statistics

Club

Honours 
Lecce

 Serie C: 2017–18

References

External links
 

1996 births
People from Monfalcone
Footballers from Friuli Venezia Giulia
Living people
Italian footballers
Association football defenders
Udinese Calcio players
Hellas Verona F.C. players
F.C. Südtirol players
U.S. Lecce players
Venezia F.C. players
U.S. Catanzaro 1929 players
U.S. Triestina Calcio 1918 players
Taranto F.C. 1927 players
A.C.N. Siena 1904 players
Serie A players
Serie B players
Serie C players